Siphosturmia is a genus of flies in the family Tachinidae.

Species
S. baccharis (Reinhard, 1922)
S. confusa Reinhard, 1931
S. maltana Reinhard, 1951
S. melampyga (Reinhard, 1931)
S. melitaeae (Coquillett, 1897)
S. oteroensis (Reinhard, 1934)
S. phyciodis (Coquillett, 1897)
S. rostrata (Coquillett, 1895)

References

Diptera of North America
Exoristinae
Tachinidae genera
Taxa named by Daniel William Coquillett